The Droitwich Spa Lido is a lido in Droitwich Spa, Worcestershire, England.  It is one of the few remaining inland, open-air salt-water swimming pools in the UK.

Brief history

The Lido was originally built in the 1930s to a design by Edward Prentice Mawson and the building features an art-deco style interior. The pool itself was filled with diluted brine, pumped from brine streams beneath the town. The salt in the water was strong enough to keep the water in the pool aseptic, without the need for additional chemicals such as chlorine.

When the lido opened, it was marketed as the 'seaside come to Droitwich Spa', and the  pool was heated to exactly the same temperature as the Mediterranean Sea.

During the Second World War, the lido was closed, and its offices used by the military.

Resurrection

The lido continued to be a popular tourist attraction. Even after its closure at the end of the 1990s, people still travelled for miles just to see the once-popular pool.

In late 2004, Wychavon District Council voted against the re-opening of the lido, which sparked a local campaign group to form, with the sole aim of seeing the lido restored. Called "Save a Lido Today" (SALT), the group put pressure on the various councils and even went so far as to provide a business plan.

In April 2005, the people of Droitwich Spa held a parish poll in which 98% of the people who voted were in favour of restoring the Lido. Following this, SALT continued to work with the District and Town councils to restore the Lido to a working condition.

In the summer of 2007, the Lido reopened. One of the schools in Droitwich, Westacre Middle School, was the first to be able to go into the pool.  Although the diving area has been filled-in to lower the water heating costs, the original 1930s fascia was left intact and the water still uses the salt that is the reason for the existence of Droitwich Spa itself.

External links
 Save A Lido Today (SALT) Campaign Website
 A virtual tour of the Lido

Buildings and structures in Worcestershire
Sports venues in Worcestershire
History of Worcestershire
Lidos
Droitwich Spa